The male first name Ercole, Italian version of Hercules, can refer to:

People
 Ercole (name), list of people with the name

House of D'Este
Ercole I d'Este (1431–1505), Duke of Ferrara
Ercole II d'Este (1508–1559), Duke of Ferrara, Modena and Reggio
Ercole III d'Este (Ercole Rinaldo) (1727–1803), Duke of Modena and Reggio

Opera and Film
Ercole amante (Hercules in Love), an opera by Francesco Cavalli
Ercole su'l Termodonte (Hercules in Thermodon), an opera by Antonio Vivaldi
Le nozze d'Ercole e d'Ebe (The Marriage of Hercules and Hebe), an Italian-German opera
Le pillole di Ercole, a 1962 Italian comedy film

Places
Porto Ercole Italian town

See also
Heracles (disambiguation)
Hercules (disambiguation)
Hercules' Club (disambiguation)
Hercule (disambiguation)

Italian masculine given names